Truman Brothers is an American pop/rock Christian duo composed of brothers Ben and Chad Truman from Nashville, TN. The band was formed in Provo, UT in 2005 while the brothers were attending Brigham Young University. They were one of the first acts to ever perform at Velour Live Music Gallery.

In 2019, the duo was signed to Shadow Mountain Records in Salt Lake City, UT. Their EP, Quiet Revolution, was subsequently released in 2021, debuting at #10 on the iTunes Christian Albums chart. In 2022, they won the Praiseworthy Award for Best Original Religious Song for their single "Before the Calm".

The brothers released a follow-up EP, Face the Fire, on August 31, 2022, featuring the lead single "Oh Child".

In addition to their work as a duo, the brothers are also members of the Nashville Tribute Band.

Ben and Chad are the sons of Diamond Rio musician, Dan Truman.

References

Musical groups from Utah
Musical groups established in 2005
2005 establishments in Utah